Puneet Malik (born 30 September 1991) is an Indian cricketer. He made his Twenty20 debut for Bihar in the 2018–19 Syed Mushtaq Ali Trophy on 28 February 2019.

References

External links
 

1991 births
Living people
Indian cricketers
Bihar cricketers
Place of birth missing (living people)